Krasnodon, known officially as Teple since 2016, is an urban-type settlement in Krasnodon Municipality in Dovzhansk Raion of Luhansk Oblast in eastern Ukraine. Population:

Demographics
Native language distribution as of the Ukrainian Census of 2001:
 Ukrainian: 2.12%
 Russian: 97.80%
 Others 0.08%

References

Urban-type settlements in Dovzhansk Raion